The 1959 NASCAR Grand National Series was the 11th season of professional stock car racing in the United States. The season, which began on November 9, 1958 in Fayetteville, North Carolina, was contested over 44 races. The season ended at  Concord Speedway  in Concord, North Carolina, on October 25, 1959. Lee Petty was the drivers' champion, while his son, Richard won the NASCAR Rookie of the Year award. Chevrolet won the Manufacturers' Championship. It was also the last season without NASCAR legend David Pearson until 1987.

Results

References

 

NASCAR Cup Series seasons